Simanovich is a gender-neutral Slavic surname. Notable people with the surname include:

Anastasia Simanovich (born 1995), Russian water polo player
Dzianis Simanovich (born 1987), Belarusian racewalker

Russian-language surnames
Surnames from given names